Kamlabai Gokhale (born Kamlabai Kamath; 1900 – 17 May 1998) was one of the first actresses in Indian cinema, along with her mother Durgabai Kamat.

Personal life
She was the daughter of Durgabai Kamat and Anand Kamat Nasnodkar, a professor of history at the  J.J. School of Art . She married Raghunathrao Gokhale and had three children, Chandrakant Gokhale, Lalji Gokhale and Suryakant Gokhale. Chandrakant Gokhale is the father of Vikram Gokhale (occasionally credited as Vikram Gokhle), a well-known Indian film, television and stage actor. Lalji Gokhale and Suryakant Gokhale were acclaimed Tabala maestros. 
Kamlabai was 25 when she became a widow, pregnant with her third child. Born in 1900,daughter of Durgabai Kamat, famous yesteryear actress.

Career
Her first stage appearance was at the age of four. 

Around 1912-1913, Dadasaheb Phalke, the pioneering film-maker of India, was casting for his film Mohini Bhasmasur and he chose Kamlabai for the lead. Her mother played the role of Parvati.  Phalke had been forced to use a young male cook, Salunke, to play the female lead in his earlier film, Raja Harishchandra, for lack of an actress. 

By the time she was 15, Kamlabai had become a celebrity. 

The following year she married Raghunathrao Gokhale. He had been with the Kirloskar Natak Company where he usually performed female roles. But his voice was breaking and so he moved to his brother’s company, which was the same one where Kamlabai and her mother were employed. The young couple was cast as the new lead pair of the company. 

In the 1930s, Kamlabai worked under Veer Savarkar in the play Ushaap, which focussed on the plight of Harijans. Kamalabai worked in around 35 movies. Her last film was Gehrayee (1980).

Partial filmography

1913: Mohini Bhasmasur - Mohini
1931: Devi Devayani Sharmistha - Miss Kamala
1932: Sheil Bala
1932: Niti Vijay
1932: Char Chakram
1932: Bhutio Mahal
1933: Rajrani Meera
1933: Mirza Sahiban
1933: Lal-e-Yaman - Lalarukh
1933: Krishna Sudama
1933: Chandrahasa
1933: Bhool Bhulaiyan
1933: Bhola Shikar
1933: Aurat Ka Dil
1934: Gunsundari - Sushila
1934: Ambarish
1934: Afghan Abla
1935: Bikhare Moti
1935: Barrister’s Wife
1936: Prabhu Ka Pyara
1936: Be Kharab Jan
1936: Aakhri Galti
1938: Street Singer (as Miss Kamala)
1938: Chabukwali
1939: Garib Ka Lal
1942: Basant
1944: Stunt King
1946: Sona Chandi
1946: Haqdar
1949: Navajeevanam - Kamala
1952: Aladdin Aur Jadui Chirag
1954: Nastik - Kamla
1962: Private Detective
1967: Balyakalasakhi
1971: Hulchul
1972: Ek Nazar

References

Marathi actors
 1900 births
1998 deaths
Actresses in Marathi cinema
Indian film actresses
20th-century Indian actresses